Defluviimonas denitrificans is a Gram-negative, chemoheterotrophic and moderately halophilic bacterium from the genus of Defluviimonas which has been isolated from a biofilter of a marine aquaculture system in Rehovot in Israel.

References 

Rhodobacteraceae
Bacteria described in 2013